The Federal Indian Boarding School Initiative was created in June 2021 by Deb Haaland, the United States Secretary of the Interior, to investigate defunct residential boarding schools that housed Native American children that were established under the Civilization Fund Act.

Creation
Haaland announced the creation of the initiative at the National Congress of American Indians (NCAI) 2021 Mid Year Conference. The initiative came about after 215 remains were found at the Kamloops Indian Residential School in Kamloops, British Columbia, Canada. The initiative will involve an investigation of the boarding schools, such as finding and reviewing records and speaking with local tribes. A report on the findings was initially set to be released in April 2022 but was released slightly later on May 11, 2022.

It is estimated that there were over 350 American Indian boarding schools in operation across the United States at one time. As of 2021, there are still Native American boarding schools in operation through the Department of the Interior, however, these schools are under day-to-day management by the Bureau of Indian Education.

Reception
Native tribes and organizations have applauded the initiative, including the National Congress of American Indians, the National Indian Child Welfare Association, Affiliated Tribes of Northwest Indians, and National Native American Boarding School Healing Coalition. National Congress of American Indians President, Fawn Sharp, of the Quinault Indian Nation released the following statement on the initiative:

"“The National Congress of American Indians commends the Department of Interior for taking the essential first step of providing an official account of the atrocities that Native children experienced during the boarding school era. By documenting who, what, when and where these egregious abuses occurred, Native families may not be able to fully heal, but they may be able to begin to reconcile with the past. Many mothers, fathers, siblings, and children of boarding school victims and survivors have walked on without ever knowing the full extent of what happened to their loved ones. But knowledge is power. By learning the truth, we can finally begin reconciling the past and healing for the future.”."

Collaboration
Upon hearing of the Federal Indian Boarding School Initiative, Canadian Minister of Crown–Indigenous Relations, Carolyn Bennett offered records that had been collected by the National Centre for Truth and Reconciliation since 2016 to the United States.

Findings of the Report
On May 11, 2022, Volume 1 of the report was released and identified further steps that would need to be taken for a second volume of the report. As information for Volume 1 was being collected during the COVID-19 pandemic, many federal offices were closed which hindered investigation efforts.

Volume 1 of the 106 page report, officially named the Federal Indian Boarding School Initiative Investigative Report  identifies 408 boarding schools and at least 53 burial sites that operated across the mainland United States, Alaska, and Hawaii over a 150-year period. The report explains the laws and policies that aided in creation of the schools, the role of religious organizations in running the schools, and some of the abhorrent practices and conditions that native children were met with.

References

Assimilation of indigenous peoples of North America